Arcelia is one of the 81 municipalities of Guerrero, in south-western Mexico. The municipal seat lies at Arcelia. The municipality covers an area of 725.1 km².

As of 2005, the municipality had a total population of 31,401. 

Herón Sarabia Mendoza, candidate for Municipal President in 2018 (Morena) and another person were assassinated by La Familia Michoacana.

References

Municipalities of Guerrero